Abraham Lewis may refer to:

 Abraham Kirkpatrick Lewis (1815–1860), pioneer coal miner in Pittsburgh, Pennsylvania
 Abraham Lincoln Lewis (1865–1947), American businessman